John B. Alexander (born 1937) is a retired United States Army colonel. An infantry officer for much of his career, he is best known as a leading advocate for the development of non-lethal weapons and of military applications of the paranormal. He has written and lectured on UFOs. He characterizes his career as having "evolved from hard-core mercenary to thanatologist". Alexander figures prominently in journalist Jon Ronson's book The Men Who Stare At Goats (2004), which was later made into a Hollywood film starring George Clooney (2009). Robson continued to draw on Alexander's former status and knowledge in several related Channel 4 documentaries, where Ronson examined the subject of New Age ideas influencing the U.S. military.

Biography 
Alexander was born in New York in 1937. He enlisted in the Army as a private in 1956, ultimately retiring as a colonel in 1988. A "mustang," Alexander was selected to attend Officer Candidate School as a sergeant first class. While on active duty, he received degrees from the University of Nebraska (B.G.S. with a concentration in sociology, 1971), Pepperdine University (M.A. in education, 1975) and Walden University (Ph.D. in education, 1980).

His assignments include: Commander, Army Special Forces Teams, US Army, Thailand, Vietnam, 1966–69; Chief of Human Resources Division, US Army, Ft. McPherson, GA, 1977–79; Inspector General, Department of Army, Washington, 1980–82; Chief of Human Technology, Army Intelligence Command, US Army, Arlington, VA 1982-83; Manager of Tech. Integration, Army Materiel Command, US Army, Alexandria, VA, 1983–85; Director, Advanced Concepts US Army Lab. Command, Aldelphi, MD 1985-88.

Alexander describes his assignment in 1971 as an infantry officer at Schofield Barracks, Hawaii, during which time he went diving in the Bimini Islands in search of the mythological continent of Atlantis. During his career in the army he showed exceptional interest in esoteric techniques explored by Lieutenant Colonel Jim Channon in his First Earth Battalion manual. An example is neuro-linguistic programming, with which he hoped to create "Jedi warriors" (according to his own account in his 1990 book The Warrior's Edge). He has published another book, UFOs: Myths, Conspiracies, and Realities.

From 1982 to 1983, Alexander directly reported to Major General Albert Stubblebine as a self-described "freelance colonel" while Stubblebine redesigned the U.S. Army intelligence architecture to incorporate paranormal and New Age-influenced techniques (including Channon's research and remote viewing) during his time as commanding general of the U.S. Army Intelligence and Security Command; reportedly, Alexander was one of Stubblebine's closest colleagues.

In 1985, Alexander founded the Advanced Theoretical Physics Project, an informal cadre of "government officials" (including "people from the Army, Navy, and Air Force, plus several from the defense aerospace industries and some members from the Intelligence Community") who "took it upon themselves to find out whether there was a secret federal UFO project." Although Alexander restricted membership in the group to invitees with a demonstrable interest in the phenomenon and a minimum security clearance of Top Secret-SCI at SI-TK in the hope that "those involved [in a black program on UFOs] would probably be willing to work with a group that had appropriate clearances and could help disseminate information," the group ultimately concluded that "there was no program" and that information collection among the military, Intelligence Community and other federal agencies "was pretty much ad hoc." At the 2011 MUFON Symposium, Alexander’s speech on UFOs was jeered by attendees after he denied all government related conspiracies, and all claims of government “silencing” or harassment.

Alexander received a National Award for Volunteerism from President Ronald Reagan in 1987 and the Aerospace Laureate Award from Aviation Week in 1993 and 1994.

The Albuquerque Journal reported in March 1993 that "last year, Alexander organized a national conference devoted to researching 'reports of ritual abuse, near-death experiences, human contacts with extraterrestrial aliens and other so-called anomalous experiences.'

Following his retirement from the Army, Alexander served for several years as Program Manager for Non-Lethal Defense at Los Alamos National Laboratory. In this capacity, he conducted non-lethal warfare briefings at the highest levels of government, including the Executive Office of the President, the United States National Security Council, members of Congress, the Director of Central Intelligence and senior Department of Defense officials. In 2003, he served as a mentor to senior officials in the Afghan Ministry of Defense through the Office of Military Cooperation–Afghanistan. Beginning in 2005 and continuing for nearly a decade thereafter, he was a Senior Fellow in the Department of Strategic Studies at the Joint Special Operations University; during this period, the JSOU Press published several of his monographs on national security matters.

Alexander lives in Las Vegas, Nevada with his wife Victoria, a fellow UFO researcher.

Works

Articles
 "The New Mental Battlefield: 'Beam Me Up, Spock.'" Military Review, vol. LX, no. 12 (Dec. 1980), pp. 47+. Full issue.

Books
The Warrior's Edge (1990), with Richard Groller and Janet Morris. William Morrow & Co.
Discusses meditation, active listening, intuition, visualization, biofeedback, martial arts, and psychokinesis as researched by the U.S. military.
Future War: Non-Lethal Weapons in Modern Warfare (1999). Thomas Dunne Books. Foreword by Tom Clancy. .
Winning the War: Advanced Weapons, Strategies, and Concepts for the Post-9/11 World (2003). Thomas Dunne Books. .
UFOs: Myths, Conspiracies, and Realities (2011) Thomas Dunne Books. Foreword by Jacques Vallée. Introduction by Burt Rutan.
Reality Denied: Firsthand Experiences with Things that Can't Happen - But Did (2017). Anomalist Books. Foreword by Uri Geller.

Reviews
 Review of The UFO Encyclopedia: The Phenomena from the Beginning (3rd ed., 2 vol.) by Jerome Clark. Journal of Scientific Exploration, vol. 34, no. 1 (2020), pp. 137-140. .

In popular culture
Alexander is interviewed for the documentary featurette "The Science Behind the Fiction" which appears on the DVD for the 2009 film Push. There he discusses his personal experiences with paranormality within the US military. He claims that the Soviet Typhoon class submarine first became known to American military intelligence by paranormal methods.

See also 
 National Institute for Discovery Science
 Skinwalker Ranch

References

External links 
Official webpage
John B. Alexander at IMDb

United States Army officers
1937 births
Ufologists
UFO writers
Living people